Lorenzo Robin Masselli (Johannesburg, 17 April 1997) is a South African born, Italian rugby union player. His usual position is as a Flanker and he currently plays for Zebre in Pro14.

He played for Zebre in Pro14 from 2019 to 2021.   

In 2016 and 2017, Masselli was named in the Italy Under 20 squad.

References

External links
It's Rugby Profile
Profile Player

1997 births
Living people
Italian rugby union players
Sportspeople from Johannesburg
Rugby union flankers
Rugby Lyons Piacenza players
Zebre Parma players